XEMW-AM/XHEMW-FM is a radio station on 1260 AM and 91.1 FM in San Luis Río Colorado, Sonora. It is owned by Radio Grupo OIR and is known as Río Digital with a pop format.

History

XEMW received its concession on January 20, 1962. It was owned by Francisco González Magallanes and originally broadcast on 1270 kHz as a 1,000-watt daytimer.

On February 1, 1978, the concession was transferred to XEMW, S.A. de C.V. The station had moved to 1260 by the late 1980s, which allowed it to begin nighttime service. Through 2018, XEMW was known as Sonido Zeta with Regional Mexican music.

Upon second-wave AM-FM migration of XEMW and XELBL, a format shuffle brought XELBL's romantic format to the new XHEMW-FM 91.1. In February 2019, XHEMW and XHLBL swapped formats, with Radio Centro moving to 93.9 and Río Digital to 91.1.

References

Radio stations in Sonora
Radio stations established in 1962